Henry Rowland (born Heinrich Wilhelm von Bock; December 28, 1913 – April 26, 1984) was an American film and television actor. He is remembered for his role as Count Kolinko in the Zorro television series.

Biography
Rowland was born in Omaha, Nebraska. His father left Germany before World War I began and became a professor of German at the University of Nebraska. Following the war, Rowland was educated in Germany through the secondary level. He returned to the United States and studied acting in Pasadena.

Rowland was born in the American Midwest. Rowland "heiled" and "achtunged" his way through a variety of films, ranging from Casablanca to Russ Meyer's Supervixens. Conversely, he showed up as an American flight surgeon in 1944's Winged Victory, billed under his Army rank as Corporal Henry Rowland. In his last years, Rowland had continued playing such Germanic characters as the Amish farmer in The Frisco Kid (1979).

He appeared six times on the  western series Annie Oakley, starring Gail Davis and Brad Johnson. He was also cast in the television series Brave Eagle, Fury, The Lone Ranger,  Zorro, The Rifleman, Tales of Wells Fargo (episode "Laredo"), and Gunsmoke.

For his contribution to the television industry, Henry Rowland has a star on the Hollywood Walk of Fame at 6328 Hollywood Boulevard.

Partial filmography

 Safari (1940) – Steersman
 Escape (1940) – Hotel Bellhop (uncredited)
 Underground (1941) – Paul, Underground Member on Motorcycle (uncredited)
 International Squadron (1941) – German (uncredited)
 A Yank in the R.A.F. (1941) – German Soldier (uncredited)
 Dangerously They Live (1941) – Telegraph Operator (uncredited)
 Captains of the Clouds (1942) – German Pilot (uncredited)
 Ship Ahoy (1942) – Operator Contacting Submarine (uncredited)
 Pacific Rendezvous (1942) – Elevator Operator at Park Hotel (uncredited)
 The Phantom Plainsmen (1942) – Lindrick
 The Pied Piper (1942) – MP
 Berlin Correspondent (1942) – Pilot
 Desperate Journey (1942) – German Fighter Pilot (uncredited)
 Hitler – Dead or Alive (1942) – Col. Hecht's Subordinate (uncredited)
 Casablanca (1942) – German Officer (uncredited)
 Reunion in France (1942) – Sentry (uncredited)
 The Moon Is Down (1943) – Capt. Loft
 Edge of Darkness (1943) – Helmut (uncredited)
 Nazty Nuisance (1943) – Nazi Submarine Radio Officer (uncredited)
 Appointment in Berlin (1943) – Radio Operator (uncredited)
 First Comes Courage (1943) – Private (uncredited)
 Sahara (1943) – Captured German Private (uncredited)
 Paris After Dark (1943) – Capt. Franck
 The Desert Song (1943) – German Officer (uncredited)
 Resisting Enemy Interrogation (1944) – German Sgt. Renser (uncredited)
 Winged Victory (1944) – Flight Surgeon
 13 Rue Madeleine (1946) – Gestapo Man with Kuncel (uncredited)
 Rendezvous 24 (1946) – Otto Manfred
 The Searching Wind (1946) – Capt. Hetderbreck (uncredited)
 Gallant Journey (1946) – Cornelius Rheinlander (uncredited)
 Dangerous Millions (1946) – Leo Turkan
 13 Rue Madeleine (1946) – Gestapo Man with Kuncel (uncredited)
 Golden Earrings (1947) – SS Trooper Pfeiffer (uncredited)
 To the Victor (1948) – Hermann Zinzer
 I, Jane Doe (1948) – German Lieutenant (uncredited)
 Rogues' Regiment (1948) – Erich Otto Heindorf
 Battleground (1949) – German NCO (uncredited)
 Port of New York (1949) – Sam Harris (uncredited)
 Bells of Coronado (1950) – Foreign Smuggler (uncredited)
 The Asphalt Jungle (1950) – Frank Schurz – Doc's Taxi Driver (uncredited)
 The Showdown (1950) – Dutch
 King Solomon's Mines (1950) – Traum – Safari Client (uncredited)
 Up Front (1951) – Observer Krausmeyer (uncredited)
 The House on Telegraph Hill (1951) – Sergeant, Interpreter (uncredited)
 Sealed Cargo (1951) – First Mate Anderson (uncredited)
 Ten Tall Men (1951) – Kurt
 Zombies of the Stratosphere (1952, Serial) – Dapper Gangster on Plane [Ch. 4] (uncredited)
 Wagon Team (1952) – Mike McClure
 Operation Secret (1952) – Fritz – German MP (uncredited)
 Wyoming Roundup (1952) – Bill Howard
 Thunderbirds (1952) – German Gunner (uncredited)
 Jungle Drums of Africa (1953) – Kurgan
 Prince of Pirates (1953) – Greb
 Rebel City (1953) – Hardy
 Siren of Bagdad (1953) – Bandit Raider (uncredited)
 Topeka (1953) – Cheated Gambler
 Gun Fury (1953) – Second Poker Player (uncredited)
 All the Brothers Were Valiant (1953) – Jones
 Vigilante Terror (1953) – Mayor Winch
 Captain John Smith and Pocahontas (1953) – Turnbull
 El Alaméin (1953) – Nazi Officer
 Wyoming Renegades (1954) – Elza Lay
 Fireman Save My Child (1954) – Fireman (uncredited)
 Return to Treasure Island (1954) – Williams
 Ring of Fear (1954) – Lunch Counter Proprietor (uncredited)
 The Gambler from Natchez (1954) – Gottwald (uncredited)
 Two Guns and a Badge (1954) – Jim Larkin – Outlaw
 Prince of Players (1955) – Sergeant (uncredited)
 The Fast and the Furious (1955) – Motorist in Park
 Untamed (1955) – Rider (uncredited)
 East of Eden (1955) – Helper at Boxcar (uncredited)
 The Man from Bitter Ridge (1955) – Townsman (uncredited)
 Kiss of Fire (1955) – Acosta
 Bobby Ware Is Missing (1955) – Construction Foreman (uncredited)
 Illegal (1955) – Jailer (uncredited)
 The Spoilers (1955) – Cole (uncredited)
 Uranium Boom (1956) – Harry
 Attack (1956) – German with Binoculars
 The White Squaw (1956) – Cowhand (uncredited)
 Friendly Persuasion (1956) – O'Hara (uncredited)
 The Women of Pitcairn Island (1956) – Muskie
 Hot Shots (1956) – Karl
 Kelly and Me (1957) – Grip (uncredited)
 The Big Land (1957) – Kurt (uncredited)
 The Girl in the Kremlin (1957) – Policeman (uncredited)
 Gun Duel in Durango (1957) – Roy
 Shoot-Out at Medicine Bend (1957) – Farmer (uncredited)
 Hell on Devil's Island (1957) – Guard #1 (uncredited)
 Chicago Confidential (1957) – Milt the Bartender (uncredited)
 Looking for Danger (1957) – Sgt. Wetzel
 My Man Godfrey (1957) – Ship Manifest Officer (uncredited)
 The Young Lions (1958) – Sergeant (uncredited)
 The Beast of Budapest (1958) – Radio Voice (voice, uncredited)
 The Left Handed Gun (1958) – Man on Street with Deputy (uncredited)
 The Case Against Brooklyn (1958) – Police Desk Sgt. (uncredited)
 Street of Darkness (1958) – Inspector
 Official Detective (1958) "Hired Killer" – Finch (uncredited) 
 Imitation General (1958) – German Tank Commander #1 (uncredited)
 Me and the Colonel (1958) – German Captain (uncredited)
 Wolf Larsen (1958) – Henderson
 Toby Tyler (1960) – Circus Cook (uncredited)
 Man on a String (1960) – German Radio Dispatcher (uncredited)
 Seven Ways from Sundown (1960) – Sam (uncredited)
 Four Horsemen of the Apocalypse (1962) – Gestapo Officer (uncredited)
 36 Hours (1964) – German Soldier
 Morituri (1965) – Crew Member (uncredited)
 Beyond the Valley of the Dolls (1970) – Otto
 The Seven Minutes (1971) – Yerkes' Butler
 Diamonds Are Forever (1971) – Dr. Tynan (uncredited)
 Supervixens (1975) – Martin Bormann
 Beneath the Valley of the Ultra-Vixens (1979) – Martin Bormann
 The Frisco Kid (1979) – 1st Farmer – Amish Man

Selected Television

References

External links
 
 

1913 births
1984 deaths
20th-century American male actors
American male film actors
American male television actors
Burials at Los Angeles National Cemetery
Male Western (genre) film actors
Male actors from Nebraska
United States Army personnel of World War II
United States Army soldiers
Western (genre) television actors